This is a complete list of AMA Superbike Championship champions since 1976.

Champions

By season

By rider

By nationality

By manufacturer

References

AMA Superbike Championship
AMA Superbike champions